The Tenth Man is a 1959 American play, adapted from The Dybbuk from S. Ansky. It had 623 performances over its year-and-a-half-long Broadway run.

Cast
 Jacob Ben-Ami as Foreman
 Donald Harron as Arthur Landau
 Arnold Marlé as Hirshman
 George Voskovec as Alper
 Jack Gilford as Zitorsky
 Lou Jacobi as Schlissel
 Gene Saks as Rabbi
 Risa Schwartz as Evelyn Foreman
 David Vardi as Sexton
 Tim Callaghan as Policeman
 Martin Garner as Harris
 Alan Manson as Kessler Boy
 Paul Marin as Kessler Boy

Plot
The play involves several elderly Jewish men from the old country, Russia, all members of a small synagogue in Mineola, Long Island. The play opens with the hapless Sexton's daily quest to gather ten males to constitute a minyan required in Jewish tradition to conduct a religious service. This search has suddenly become critical as the granddaughter of one of the men has apparently become possessed by the spirit of a dybbuk, an evil spirit.
The grandfather leaves the girl sitting in the office of the temple's young rabbi, who is progressive and not likely to believe in the existence of evil spirits.
The men then desperately begin to search for the necessary tenth man so they can hold the prayer service and attempt to exorcise the malevolent spirit.
A young non-believing Jewish man wanders into the synagogue suffering a hangover from a night spent getting drunk. He sees the granddaughter sitting semi conscious and is moved and begins to fall in love. The older men are glad to welcome him because they now have the necessary ten males. The rabbi agrees to conduct the exorcism with the aid of an elderly robed man, the "cabalist" who had been praying in the temple.

Reception
In The New York Times, Arthur Cantor wrote that The Tenth Man "marked a great leap forward from the easy naturalism of the first Chayefsky theater work [...] and displayed his gift for picturesque speech and penchant for themes of mysticism."

See also
Minyan

References

External links
 

1959 plays
Plays by Paddy Chayefsky